Shlomo Dykman (10 February 1917 – 1965) was a Polish-Israeli translator and classical scholar.

Biography
Dykman was born in 1917 in Warsaw, Poland. He attended school at the "Hinuch" Hebrew Gymnasium, and then studied the classics at the Institute of Jewish Studies at Warsaw University.

He began publishing translations and literary reviews in Poland in 1935, including translations from Hebrew into Polish. In 1939, he published a Polish translation of all of Bialik's poems.

Following the outbreak of World War II and the division of Poland between Germany and the Soviet Union, he fled to Bukhara, where he taught Hebrew. In 1944, he was arrested by the Soviet authorities and accused of Zionist and Counter-revolutionary activities. He was initially sentenced to death, but the sentence was commuted to five to ten years hard labour, which he served in the coals mines in the Arctic region of the northern Urals. In 1957, he returned to Warsaw and, in 1960, he emigrated to Israel and settled in Jerusalem.

Dykman published many Hebrew translations of Greek literature and of the Roman and Latin classics. Among his translations were the tragedies of "Aeschylus" and "Sophocles", the poem "Aeneid" by Virgil and "Metamorphoses" by Ovid.

Awards and honours
 In 1961, Dykman was awarded the Tchernichovsky Prize for exemplary translation.
 In 1965, he was awarded the Israel Prize, in literature.

Family
His son, Aminadav Dykman, is a translator and literary scholar.

References

See also
List of Israel Prize recipients

1917 births
1965 deaths
20th-century Israeli Jews
Polish emigrants to Israel
Israeli translators
Polish translators
Hebrew-language writers
Israel Prize in literature recipients
Writers from Warsaw
University of Warsaw alumni
20th-century translators
Jewish translators
Translators of Virgil